Gibberula gironai is a species of very small sea snail, a marine gastropod mollusk or micromollusk in the family Cystiscidae.

Description
Males can reach a maximum length of 0.2 cm

Distribution
This species can be found in the Western Atlantic.

References

Cystiscidae
Gastropods described in 2007